Anna Pavlova, also known as A Woman for All Time, is a 1983 biographical drama film depicting the life of the Russian ballet dancer Anna Pavlova, written and directed by Emil Loteanu and starring Galina Belyayeva, James Fox and Sergey Shakurov. It depicts Pavlova's passion for art and her collaboration with the reformers of ballet including Michel Fokine, Vaslav Nijinsky and Sergei Diaghilev.

A co-production between the United Kingdom and the Soviet Union, famed British director Michael Powell served as a producer and featured American director Martin Scorsese in a cameo role.

Plot
The film opens in the cold Saint Petersburg with a scene where Anna as a young girl observes through a window young dancers practicing. Although she catches a cold, Anna decides that she does not merely want to be a dancer but that she wants to be one of the best.

It is shown how classical master dancer/ballet teacher Marius Petipa helps Anna on to the path to glory and her rise in the imperial Mariinsky Theatre in St. Petersburg. Here she meets the young choreographer Mikhail Fokine with whom she rehearses The Dying Swan – the world-famous solo.

In 1909, Sergei Diaghilev founds the Ballets Russes in Paris for which he recruits the best Russian dancers and choreographers including Anna Pavlova. But after a short time she decides to move to London. Here, she also celebrates major success and her triumph is worldwide; for example she performs in the United States, Mexico and Venezuela. Always present is Victor Dandré – her manager, companion and husband.

Her biggest wish to once again to perform at her native Mariinsky Theatre remained unfulfilled. Anna died from pneumonia at the age of 49 in the year 1931 during her farewell tour in The Hague.

Cast

 Galina Belyayeva as Anna Pavlova 
 Lina Buldakova as young Anna
  as Anna's dancing double
 Sergey Shakurov as Michel Fokine
 Vsevolod Larionov as Sergei Diaghilev
 James Fox as Victor Dandré
 Mikhaill Krapivin as Vaslav Nijinsky
 Svetlana Toma as Anna's mother
 Georgio Dimitriou as Enrico Cecchetti
 Natalya Fateyeva as Mathilde Kschessinska
 Pyotr Gusev as Marius Petipa
 Anatoli Romashin as Alexandre Benois
 Igor Dmitriev as Léon Bakst
 Jacques Debary as Camille Saint-Saëns
 Igor Sklyar as Serge Lifar
 Grigore Grigoriu as Mikhail Mordkin
 Tiit Härm as Alexandre Volinine
 Leonid Markov as 
  as 
 Vsevolod Safonov as Vladimir Frederiks
 Nikolai Kryukov as Oscar II of Sweden
 Martin Scorsese as Giulio Gatti-Casazza
 John Murray as Sol Hurok
 Bruce Forsyth as Alfred Batt
 Roy Kinnear as Gardener
 Svetlana Svetlichnaya as Masha
 Afanasi Trishkin as Sergeyev
 Emil Loteanu as Cabaret director
 Galina Kravchenko

Production
Martin Scorsese, a great admirer of Michael Powell's films, originally convinced Robert De Niro to play the American impresario Sol Hurok

 and Jack Nicholson to portray Pavlova's husband and manager, Victor Dandré. The casting was rejected by the Russian Ministry of Culture, as The Deer Hunter in which De Niro acted was conceived as anti-Communist, and Nicholson had made disparaging remarks about the Soviet Union in interviews. Nicholson's role was eventually played by James Fox and De Niro's by John Murray, the brother of Bill Murray.

The ensemble of the Leningrad Kirov Ballet danced the original choreography, and in original decor and most of Pavlova's repertoire is performed.

Post-production
There were tensions at Mosfilm during editing due to its almost three-hour length. The contract stated that Loteanu had control over the English version, yet the film was shortened dramatically. Loteanu stated "Had I known at the outset that the contract would be broken, I would not have made the film at all."

Release
Anna Pavlova was theatrically released in the Soviet Union in August 1983, via its original 155-minute version. It was released in the United Kingdom on 10 March 1985, in a 133-minute edit.

The television version, which premiered in 1986, consists of five parts, each 55 minutes apiece: "Rossi Street", "Undying Swan", "Tulips and Loneliness", "Dreams of Russia" and "Touching the Sunset".

References

External links
 

1983 films
1980s English-language films
1980s Russian-language films
1983 multilingual films
1980s biographical drama films
British biographical drama films
British multilingual films
Soviet multilingual films
Soviet biographical drama films
Films about ballet
Films directed by Emil Loteanu
Films set in 1909
Films set in 1931
Films set in London
British films set in New York City
Films set in Paris
Films set in Saint Petersburg
Films set in the 19th century
Films set in the 20th century
Films shot in London
Films shot in New York City
Mosfilm films
Biographical films about entertainers
Cultural depictions of dancers
Cultural depictions of classical musicians
Cultural depictions of Russian women
Cultural depictions of Swedish kings
1983 drama films
1980s British films